Arthur Jeffrey Dempster (August 14, 1886 – March 11, 1950) was a Canadian-American physicist best known for his work in mass spectrometry and his discovery in 1935 of the uranium isotope 235U.

Early life and education

Dempster was born in Toronto, Ontario, Canada.  He received his bachelor's and master's degrees at the University of Toronto in 1909 and 1910, respectively.  He travelled to study in Germany, and then left at the outset of World War I for the United States; there he received his Ph.D. in physics at the University of Chicago.

Academic career
Dempster joined the physics faculty at the University of Chicago in 1916 and remained there until his death in 1950.

During World War II he worked on the secret Manhattan Project to develop the world's first nuclear weapons.

From 1943 to 1946, Dempster was chief physicist of the University of Chicago's Metallurgical Laboratory or "Met Lab" which integrally related to the Manhattan Project and founded to study the materials necessary for the manufacture of atomic bombs.

In 1946, he took a position as a division director at the Argonne National Laboratory.

Dempster died on March 11, 1950, in Stuart, Florida, at the age of 63.

Research
In 1918, Dempster developed the first modern mass spectrometer, a scientific apparatus allowing physicists to identify compounds by the mass of elements in a sample, and determine the isotopic composition of elements in a sample.  Dempster's mass spectrometer was over 100 times more accurate than previous versions, and established the basic theory and design of mass spectrometers that is still used to this day.  Dempster's research over his career centered on the mass spectrometer and its applications, leading in 1935 to his discovery of the uranium isotope 235U.  This isotope's ability to cause a rapidly expanding fission nuclear chain reaction allowed the development of the atom bomb and nuclear power.  Dempster was also well known as an authority on positive rays.

References

1886 births
1950 deaths
People from Old Toronto
University of Toronto alumni
University of Chicago alumni
20th-century American physicists
American nuclear physicists
Canadian physicists
Canadian nuclear physicists
Mass spectrometrists
Manhattan Project people
Fellows of the American Physical Society
Members of the United States National Academy of Sciences
Presidents of the American Physical Society
Canadian emigrants to the United States